Courtney James (born December 24, 1976 in Indianapolis, Indiana) is an American retired professional basketball player.  James played collegiately with the Minnesota Golden Gophers.  He started two seasons for the Gophers before leaving the team in a dispute over a year-long team-imposed suspension.  James played with GS Larissa for part of a season in Greece before returning to continue his professional career in the United States.  He joined the Fort Wayne Fury of the Continental Basketball Association after some time off.

He subsequently played with the Gary Steelheads and Dakota Wizards in the same league.  In 2002, James again departed to play in Europe, this time with Ludwigsburg in Germany, but returned to the US after only two games.  James played in the USBL with the Pennsylvania ValleyDawgs and Saint Louis Skyhawks as well before being drafted by the Columbus Riverdragons of the NBDL.

References

External links
 NBDL profile

1976 births
Living people
American expatriate basketball people in Germany
American expatriate basketball people in Greece
Cincinnati Stuff players
Dakota Wizards (CBA) players
Fort Wayne Fury players
Forwards (basketball)
Gymnastikos S. Larissas B.C. players
Minnesota Golden Gophers men's basketball players
Basketball players from Indianapolis
American men's basketball players